The 2009 Avon Tyres British GT season was the 17th season of the British GT Championship. The season began at Oulton Park's Easter Monday meeting and finished on 20 September at Brands Hatch after 14 races. 2009 saw the debut of the new Supersport class. Twins David and Godfrey Jones won the GT3 title during the final race of the season. Jody Firth sealed the GT4 title, while Phil Keen and Marcus Clutton won the Supersports Class.

Drivers and Teams
 All cars ran on Avon tyres.

Calendar
 All rounds were a duration of 60 minutes, except rounds 11 and 12, which were two-hour endurance races. Only the overall winners are listed. The Donington enduro was originally scheduled for April 26, however due to ongoing issues with the circuit's track licence, the meeting was rescheduled for July 19. In the Spa-Francorchamps round, the British GT field was included in the Belcar Championship races.

Standings
Points are awarded to the top eight finishers in the order 10-8-6-5-4-3-2-1. Drivers in bold indicate pole position. Drivers in italics indicate fastest lap.

GT3

† — Drivers did not finish the race, but were classified as they completed over 90% of the race distance.

GT4

Supersport

Notes
 Renard and Vosse were not awarded points in race two at Oulton Park, due to running standard-spec pump fuel, following issues with the championship's Sunoco fuel during race one.
 Supersport Class drivers are awarded half points, due to a lack of competitors.
 At Rockingham, as the Invitation Class Ginetta won both races, Simonsen and Lester were awarded maximum points in race one, and Brown and Fisken in race two. The Ginetta also won at Brands Hatch, with Simonsen and Lester again receiving maximum points.
 From Spa onwards, half points were awarded in GT4, due to a lack of competitors.
 The Mosler MT900R of Daniel Brown and Martin Short competed at Snetterton and Donington under protest due to a loophole in the regulations. Eventually, the Mosler was stripped of points gained from the rounds.

References

External links
British GT website

GT
British GT Championship seasons